Acalolepta alorensis is a species of beetle in the family Cerambycidae. It is a scientific name for a group of Lamiinae - also called flat-faced long-horned beetles. It was described by Stephan von Breuning in 1970. It is known from Indonesia.

References

Acalolepta
Beetles described in 1970